The 1940 Jacksonville State Eagle Owls football team represented Jacksonville State Teachers College (now known as Jacksonville State University) as a member of the Alabama Intercollegiate Conference (AIC) during the 1940 college football season. Led by first-year head coach Osmo Smith, the Eagle Owls compiled an overall record of 3–5 with a mark of 3–2 in conference play.

Schedule

References

Jacksonville State
Jacksonville State Gamecocks football seasons
Jacksonville State Eagle Owls football